Brancatherulum is an extinct genus of Late Jurassic (Kimmeridgian - Tithonian) mammal from the Tendaguru Formation of Lindi Region of Tanzania. It is based on a single toothless dentary 21 mm in length. It is currently considered either a stem-zatherian or dryolestidan.

See also

 Prehistoric mammal
 List of prehistoric mammals

References

Cladotheria
Late Jurassic mammals
Jurassic mammals of Africa
Fossil taxa described in 1927
Tendaguru fauna
Prehistoric mammal genera